CRX is an American rock band formed in Los Angeles in 2013, consisting of Nick Valensi (lead vocals, guitar), Ralph Alexander (drums), Brad Oberhofer (keyboard, backing vocals), Jon Safley (bass, backing vocals) and Darian Zahedi (guitar, backing vocals). The band released their debut album, New Skin, on October 28, 2016. The album's first single, "Ways to Fake It", was released on September 7, 2016 through Vevo and Spotify. Valensi has described the band's sound as a mix of power pop and heavy metal, and has named The Cars, Cheap Trick and Elvis Costello as influences.

Band members
Current members
 Nick Valensi – lead vocals, lead guitar (2013–present)
 Darian Zahedi – rhythm guitar (2015–present)
 Brad Oberhofer – keyboard, backing vocals (2018–present)
 Jon Safley – bass guitar, synth/synth bass, percussion, backing vocals (2014–present)
 Ralph Alexander – drums, percussion (2015–present)
Former members

 Richie Follin – keyboard, guitar, backing vocals (2013–2018)

Discography

Albums
 New Skin (2016)
 Peek (2019)

Singles
 "Ways to Fake It" (2016)
 "Broken Bones" (2016)
"Love Me Again" (2018)
"We’re All Alone" (2019)
"Falling" (2019)
"Get Close" (2019)

References

External links
 

American new wave musical groups
American power pop groups
Rock music groups from California
American stoner rock musical groups
Post-punk revival music groups
Musical groups established in 2013
Musical quintets
Columbia Records artists
Musical groups from Los Angeles
2013 establishments in California